Accumulatio is a figure of speech, part of the more general group of enumeratio, in which the statements made previously are presented again in a compact, forceful manner. It often uses a climax for the summation of a speech.

The word is Latin, from a verb meaning "to amass".

Examples
"Your organization, your vigilance, your devotion to duty, your zeal for the cause must be raised to the highest intensity." Winston Churchill, Speech, 14 July 1941. (This sentence comes after a lengthy passage in which Churchill warns the public that their courage and effort are still needed to defeat the enemy).
"He is the betrayer of his own self-respect, and the waylayer of the self-respect of others; covetous, intemperate, irascible, arrogant; disloyal to his parents, ungrateful to his friends, troublesome to his kin; insulting to his betters, disdainful of his equals and mates, cruel to his inferiors; in short, he is intolerable to everyone."  (Suae pudicitiae proditor est, insidiator alienae; cupidus intemperans, petulans superbus; impius in parentes, ingratus in amicos, infestus cognatis; in superiores contumax, in aequos et pares fastidiosus, in inferiores crudelis; denique in omnes intolerabilis.) Attributed to Cicero, Rhetorica ad Herennium, IV.52

See also
Climax
Figure of speech

References

Rhetorical techniques